Clifford John Lloyd (30 September 1902 – 1975) was a Welsh footballer who played in the Football League for Nottingham Forest and Swansea Town.

References

1895 births
1979 deaths
Welsh footballers
Association football midfielders
English Football League players
Swansea City A.F.C. players
Nottingham Forest F.C. players
Crystal Palace F.C. players
Waterford F.C. players
Barrow A.F.C. players